Qarrah Dagh or Qareh Dagh or Qarah Dagh may refer to:
 Qarah Dagh, Bukan, West Azerbaijan Province
 Qarah Dagh, Mahabad, West Azerbaijan Province
 Qarrah Dagh, Zanjan